The men's doubles event at the 2010 South American Games was held over March 24–27.

Medalists

Draw

Finals

Top half

Bottom half

References
Draw

Men's Doubles